Gulf Arabic (  local pronunciation:  or  ,) is a variety of the Arabic language spoken in Eastern Arabia around the coasts of the Persian Gulf in Kuwait, Bahrain, Qatar, the United Arab Emirates, southern Iraq, eastern Saudi Arabia, northern Oman, and by some Iranian Arabs.

Gulf Arabic can be defined as a set of closely related and more-or-less mutually intelligible varieties that form a dialect continuum, with the level of mutual intelligibility between any two varieties largely depending on the distance between them. Similar to other Arabic varieties, Gulf Arabic varieties are not completely mutually intelligible with other Arabic varieties spoken outside the Gulf. The specific dialects differ in vocabulary, grammar and accent. There are considerable differences between, for instance, Kuwaiti Arabic and the dialects of Qatar and the UAE, especially in pronunciation, that may hinder mutual intelligibility. The Gulf has two major dialect types that differ phonologically and morphologically, typically referred to as badawī ('Bedouin') and ḥadarī ('sedentary'), the differences marking important cultural differences between those who historically practiced pastoralism and those who were sedentary.

Gulf varieties' closest related relatives are other dialects native to the Arabian Peninsula, i.e. Najdi Arabic, Mesopotamian Arabic and Bahrani Arabic. Although spoken over much of Saudi Arabia's area, Gulf Arabic is not the native tongue of most Saudis, as the majority of them do not live in Eastern Arabia. There are some 200,000 Gulf Arabic speakers in the country, out of a population of over 30 million, mostly in the aforementioned Eastern Province.

Name 

The dialect's full name  can be translated as 'the dialect of the gulf'. However, it is most commonly referred to as Khaliji, in which the noun  has been suffixed with the Nisba, literally meaning 'of the bay' or 'of the gulf'.

Phonology

Consonants 

Phonetic notes:
It shares this feature with most Peninsular and Mesopotamian dialects.
 Historically,  became  in Gulf Arabic. Due to influence from MSA, the sound was reintroduced in a handful of classicisms.
 The emphatic consonants  are variably described in the literature as having secondary velarization or pharyngealization. Other emphatic consonants can be found, but these are the result of a process that spreads the velarization/pharyngealization of these sounds on surrounding consonants. E.g.   ('championship') ('championship').

Allophony
The actual realization is in free variation, and can be  or, more commonly, . 'opposite');  is a contemporary reflex of historical  and so there are also sets of words where  and  appear in free variation (e.g. (e.g. 'neighbor').

Voiced stops tend to devoice in utterance-final position, especially as the final element in clusters, e.g.  ('dog')  .

A notable aspect of Gulf Arabic is the different realization of a number of phonemes inherited from Classical Arabic. These differences are the result, in part, of natural linguistic changes over time. After these changes occurred, the original sounds (or close approximations to them) were reintroduced as a result of contact with other dialects, as well as through influence of Modern Standard Arabic as a language of media, government, and religion. For many of these sounds, speakers exhibit free variation between the MSA form and the colloquial form. The following table provides a rough outline of these differences:

Vowels 
Gulf Arabic has five long vowels and three or four short monophthongs. Two recent studies point to a lack of phonemic contrast between [i] and [u], and Shockley (2020) argues that backness is not phonemically contrastive in short vowels. The most recent grammar of Gulf Arabic similarly points to a reduced central vowel [ə] as a frequent reflex of all short vowels.

Allophony
Regional variations in vowel pronunciation is considerable, particularly outside of educated speech. Unless otherwise noted, the following are major allophonic variants shared across the entire Gulf region.

Front vowels
In the context of emphatic consonants, long  and  exhibit centralized vowel onglides and offglides. For example: 
   ('mud') → .
   ('summer') →  .
  ('she menstruates') → .

  ('my daughter') → . 
   ('book') → . 
  ('go! [f]') → .

   ('medicine') → .
  ('turn over!') → .

The normal realization of short  is a front ; when adjacent to dorsal and pharyngeal consonants, the normal realization is a back ; when adjacent to emphatic consonants (and, for some speakers, bilabial consonants), the realization is a back and rounded :
   ('Bedouin') → .
  ('after') → .
   ('coffee') → .
   ('row') → .

  ('he fasted') → .
  ('he said') → .
   ('health') → .

Word-finally, long  is shortened and subjected to the same phonological rules as short . This shortening can lead to alternations based on morphological conditioning, e.g.  ('lunch') vs.  ('your lunch').

Back vowels
Similarly,  is realized  except when unstressed, in which case it is reduced to  if it is not deleted altogether (e.g.  →  or    'houses').

The short vowel phoneme  occurs rarely as a variant of the diphthong  in a handful of words (e.g. لو  'if').

Morphology 
Similarly to other Arabic varieties, Gulf Arabic has lost much of the case inflection of Classical Arabic.

Pronouns 

Gulf Arabic has 10 personal pronouns. The conservative dialect has preserved the gender differentiation of the 2nd and 3rd person in the plural forms, whereas dual forms have not survived. The following table bears the generally most common pronouns:

  Many speakers do not distinguish between masculine and feminine forms in the second person plural, replacing intum and intin with intu.
  Speakers that do not distinguish between masculine and feminine forms in the third person plural will also use hum for both genders in the third person plural, respectively.

Some pronouns, however, have other (less frequent, resp. local) forms:
 ānā:
 anā
 āni (especially Baḥrānī)
 inta:
 init
 huwa:
 hū
 huwwa (especially Qaṭarī)
 uhu
 hiya:
 hī
 hiyya (especially Qaṭarī)
 ihi
 niḥin:
 niḥna
 iḥna (especially Baḥrānī and Qaṭarī)
 ḥina (Qaṭarī)
 intum:
 intu
 hum:
 humma (especially Qaṭarī)
 uhum

Syntax
The normal word order in main clauses is the following:

Subject – (Verb) – (Direct Object) – (Indirect Object) – (Adverbials)

The following sentence indicates the normal word order of declarative statements:

When forming interrogative statements, any of these elements can be replaced by interrogative words.  identifies five such words in Gulf Arabic:
  ('who')
 (alternatively, or  ) ('what')
  ('how')
  (alternatively ) ('why')
  ('when')

Unless it is desired to stress one of these elements, this order of elements is preserved in the formation of interrogative questions.

When placing emphasis on the questioned element, word order can change. Specifically, the element of a clause can be questioned by moving it, generally to initial position. With the subject (which is normally initial), it is moved to final position:

The moved element receives strong stress; in the case of a question word, the intonation is a high fall. When the point is to seek clarification, the element questioned has a high rising intonation.

See also 
 Varieties of Arabic
 Peninsular Arabic
 Arabic language

References

Citations

Sources

Further reading
 

 
Persian Gulf
Languages of Iran
Languages of Iraq
Languages of Kuwait
Languages of Saudi Arabia
Languages of Bahrain
Languages of Qatar
Languages of the United Arab Emirates
Languages of Oman
Arabic languages
Mashriqi Arabic
Peninsular Arabic